Vitaly Lvovich Pashin (born 30 August 1981) is a Russian politician. He was a deputy of the 7th State Duma of the Russian Federation between 2016 and 2021.

Biography

Education
He studied physical education at Chelyabinsk Pedagogical University, graduating in 2006. He advanced to a degree in public administration from the Moscow Academy of Law and Management in 2011, and in 2014 received an MBA from the Russian University of Economics.

State Duma of the Russian Federation
In 2016, Pashin was elected as a deputy in the State Duma, the lower house of the Federal Assembly of Russia. He was a representative for the Chelyabinsk region. His first day in office was 18 September 2016. He was also a member of the State Duma Committee for Security and Anti-Corruption.

Pashin and fellow LDPR deputy Daniel Shilkov presented a bill in support of animal rights to the State Duma on 1 December 2016. If passed into law, the bill would create a national animal ombudsman to protect the interests of both domestic and wild animals in Russia.

References 

Living people
21st-century Russian politicians
Liberal Democratic Party of Russia politicians
Seventh convocation members of the State Duma (Russian Federation)
1981 births
People from Chelyabinsk Oblast